Possum Trot or Possumtrot may refer to:

Settlements in the United States
Possum Trot, Alabama
Possum Trot, Kentucky
Possum Trot, Missouri
Possum Trot, Texas
Possum Trot, Virginia
The former name of Red Oak, Texas

Other
Possum Trot, California - Name of the property where folk artist Calvin Black created and displayed his dolls
Possum Trot Corporation, Kentucky - a children's stuffed animal toy company.
Possumtrot Branch, a stream in Georgia
The Dogtrot house, also known as a possum-trot